The Mellow Side of Clifford Jordan is an album by saxophonist Clifford Jordan which was recorded between 1989 and 1991 and released on the Mapleshade label in 1997.

Reception

The AllMusic review by Scott Yanow observed: "Although not completely flawless, the music is quite rewarding overall and displays the flexibility and creativity of the late great Clifford Jordan".

Track listing

Personnel
Clifford Jordan – tenor saxophone, soprano saxophone
Kenny Reed – trumpet (track 3)
Julian Priester – trombone (track 6)
Carter Jefferson – tenor saxophone (tracks 2 & 6)
Fred Cook – baritone saxophone (track 6)
Chris Anderson (track 7), Larry Willis (track 3) – piano
Mike LeDonne – B3 organ (track 1)
Rudy Turner – electric guitar (track 4)
Edson Machado – drums (track 1)
Nasser Abadey – percussion (tracks 2 & 6)

References

1997 albums
Clifford Jordan albums
Mapleshade Records albums